Peter Coleman Epstein (born January 18, 1967) is an American jazz saxophonist.

Biography
Epstein learned clarinet as a youth from his father, Ed Epstein, who played saxophone, but picked up his father's instrument in his teens, playing in high school ensembles. While attending the California Institute of the Arts, Epstein studied improvisation and composition with bassist Charlie Haden, flautist James Newton, and clarinetist John Carter, concurrently exploring West African music and dance, North and South Indian classical music and Balkan folk music.

He graduated from the California Institute of the Arts with a degree in music in 1992, then moved to Brooklyn, New York and has since appeared on more than 50 recordings and toured with Ralph Alessi, Michael Cain, Scott Colley, Jerry Granelli, Carola Grey, Bobby Previte, Brad Shepik, and Marcelo Zarvos.

Epstein is a founding member of the School for Improvisational Music in New York City and has taught workshops at universities, conservatories, and festivals around the United States (Eastman School of Music, California Institute of the Arts, New England Conservatory of Music) and the world (Nepal, India, Slovenia, Poland, Sweden, Germany, Portugal, Colombia).

He received his Master of Music Degree in Saxophone Performance from the University of Nevada, Reno in 2004. In 2007 Epstein became the director of Jazz & Improvisational Music and Associate Professor of Jazz Saxophone at University of Nevada, Reno.

Discography

As leader
 Staring at the Sun (MA, 1997)
 Solus (MA, 1998)
 The Invisible (MA, 1999)
 Old School (MA, 2001)
 Lingua Franca (Songlines, 2005)
 The Dark (Origin, 2010)
 Abstract Realism (Origin, 2010)
 Polarities (Songlines, 2014)

As sideman
 Ralph Alessi, Hissy Fit (Love Slave, 1999)
 Ralph Alessi, Open Season (RKM Music, 2008)
 Michael Cain, Circa (ECM, 1997)
 Michael Cain, Phfew (MA, 1998)
 Jerry Granelli, Enter, A Dragon (Songlines, 1998)
 Jerry Granelli, Crowd Theory (Songlines, 1999)
 Carola Grey, Noisy Mama (Jazzline, 1992)
 Carola Grey, The Age of Illusions (Jazzline, 1994)
 Nu Shooz, Kung Pao Kitchen (Nu Shooz, 2012)
 Brad Shepik, The Loan (Songlines, 1998)
 Brad Shepik, The Well (Songlines, 2000)
 Miroslav Tadic, Without Words (MA, 1992)
 David Tronzo, Crunch (Love Slave, 1999)
 Marcelo Zarvos, Labyrinths (MA, 1999)
 Marcelo Zarvos, Music Journal (MA, 2000)

References

1967 births
Living people
21st-century American male musicians
21st-century American saxophonists
American jazz saxophonists
American male jazz musicians
American male saxophonists
California Institute of the Arts alumni
Musicians from Eugene, Oregon